Viktor Burakov (born 30 May 1955) is a Ukrainian former sprinter who competed in the 1980 Summer Olympics.

References

1955 births
Living people
Soviet male sprinters
Ukrainian male sprinters
Olympic athletes of the Soviet Union
Athletes (track and field) at the 1980 Summer Olympics
Universiade medalists in athletics (track and field)
Universiade gold medalists for the Soviet Union
Medalists at the 1981 Summer Universiade